Qurqurak (also Romanized as Qūrqūrak and Qorqūrīk) is a village in Zahray-ye Pain Rural District, in the Central District of Buin Zahra County, Qazvin Province, Iran. At the 2006 census, its population was 14, in 7 families.

References 

Populated places in Buin Zahra County